Modern-day Urgell, also known as Baix Urgell (baix meaning "lower", by contrast with Alt Urgell "Higher Urgell"), is a comarca (county) in Catalonia, Spain, forming only a borderland portion of the region historically known as Urgell, one of the Catalan counties.

Municipalities

See also
 Counts of Urgell
 County of Urgell
 La Seu d'Urgell
 Pla d'Urgell
 Roman Catholic Diocese of Urgell

References

External links
Official comarcal site (in Catalan)

 
Comarques of the Province of Lleida